Ganesh Hukkeri (born 24 July 1978) is an Indian politician. He is the current Member of the Karnataka Legislative Assembly from Chikkodi-Sadalga. He has a Master of Business Administration degree from Bharatesh College Of Business Administration in Belgavi.

Positions held
 Chief Whip of the Government of Karnataka until August 2019
 Parliamentary secretary to the Revenue Department of Karnataka till May 2018
 Member of Legislative Assembly From Chikkodi-Sadalga constituency twice (2014-2018 and 2018-2023) consecutively 
 Director of Karnataka Sugar Federation
 Director of District Co-op Bank Belgavi
 Former member of Belgavi Zilla Parishad

Early life
He was born to Prakash Babanna Hukkeri (Member of Legislative Council (NorthWest Karnataka Teachers constituency) and former Cabinet Minister Of Sugar, Small Business and Charity, Karnataka) in Belgavi.

An MBA graduate, he always wanted to be a social worker. Assisting his father in politics since his school days, he was involved in election campaigns since 1994 and accompanied his father during the previous five assembly elections and two Lok Sabha polls.

He was elected as a ZP member from the Examba constituency. He defeated Shashikala Annasaheb Jolle who is now a sitting MLA from Nippani assembly constituency 

He was a director of DCC Bank, Belgavi.

Legislative life 
After his father won the election of Loksabha in 2014, Hukkeri was recommended by almost all the leaders from the Belgaum district. He defeated the BJP candidate Mahantesh Kawwatagimath (MLC) by more than 33,000 votes. In September 2016, Hukkeri was appointed a parliamentary secretary in the  Revenue Department of Karnataka as a special power of the Chief Minister of Karnataka.

In his second election, in May 2018, Hukkeri defeated Annasaheb Jolle who had lost the election twice against the elder Hukkeri. Hukkeri was appointed  Chief Whip of the Government of Karnataka, a cabinet minister rank.

References

External links
 
 
  

Living people
1978 births
Karnataka district councillors
People from Belagavi district
Indian National Congress politicians from Karnataka
Karnataka MLAs 2013–2018
Karnataka MLAs 2018–2023